William Bottlesham was a medieval Bishop of Llandaff and Bishop of Rochester.

Bottlesham was made first titular Bishop of Bethlehem in 1385 and was translated from Bethlehem to Llandaff in 1386. He was then translated from Llandaff to Rochester on 27 August 1389.

Bottlesham died about 26 February 1400.

Citations

References

 

Bishops of Rochester
Bishops of Llandaff
14th-century English Roman Catholic bishops
1400 deaths
Year of birth unknown